Murata is a Japanese surname. Notable people with the surname include:

, Japanese shogi player
 Japanese shogi player
, Japanese rugby union player
, Japanese singer
, Japanese mixed martial artist
, Japanese field hockey player
, Japanese writer
, Japanese footballer
, Japanese movie director, screenwriter and actor
, 8th dan Japanese judoka and author
, Japanese artist and designer
, Japanese boxer
, Japanese scholar of comparative philosophy and mysticism
, Imperial Japanese Navy officer
, Japanese tea ceremony practicer in the Muromachi period
, Japanese video game programmer
, Japanese footballer
, Japanese shogi player
, Japanese animator
, Japanese politician, chairman of the National Public Safety Commission
, Japanese individual rhythmic gymnast
, Japanese manga artist and animator

Japanese-language surnames